The Violin sonata in G minor (HWV 364a) was composed (c. 1722–24) by George Frideric Handel for violin and basso continuo. The work is also referred to as Opus 1 No. 6, and was first published in 1732 by Walsh. Other catalogues of Handel's music have referred to the work as HG ; and HHA . Also published in HG  (with an extra part for Organo).

Both the Walsh edition and the Chrysander edition indicate that the work is for oboe, and published it as Sonata VI. It is not known whether Handel sanctioned the change of instrument, however the fact that the piece contains notes beyond the range of the oboe would suggest that he did not. Handel's original manuscript indicates that the sonata would be suitable "per la Viola da Gamba"—and the version of the work for that instrument is designated as HWV 364b.

A typical performance of the work takes just over seven minutes.

Movements
The work consists of four movements:

(Movements do not contain repeat markings unless indicated. The number of bars is taken from the Chrysander edition, and is the raw number in the manuscript—not including repeat markings.)

See also
List of solo sonatas by George Frideric Handel
XV Handel solo sonatas (publication by Chrysander)
Handel solo sonatas (publication by Walsh)

References

Violin sonatas by George Frideric Handel
1724 compositions
Compositions in G minor